The Ultimate Urban Collection is the third compilation album by Héctor & Tito. This is also their second album released after their separation in 2004. From the samples in All Music, it's clear that some tracks are live while others are studio versions.

Track listing

References

External links 
 http://www.titoelbambinoonline.com/

Héctor & Tito albums
2007 compilation albums
Reggaeton compilation albums